Elections for the Indian state of Goa took place 1999.

Results

Results by constituency
The following is the list of winning MLAs in the election.

Government formation 
Indian National Congress formed the government under the leadership of Luizinho Faleiro which lasted for 169 days. Francisco Sardinha broke the Indian National Congress and formed the government with the help of Bharatiya Janata Party which lasted for 334 days.

On 24 October 2000, Bharatiya Janata Party formed its first government in Goa under the leadership of Manohar Parrikar which lasted for 1 year and 223 days before the next elections were called off.

References

State Assembly elections in Goa
1990s in Goa
1999 State Assembly elections in India